James A. Shelton was born in Denton, Montana in 1916, and enlisted in the United States Navy on 15 January 1941. Appointed an aviation cadet on 20 March 1941, he trained at Pensacola, Miami, and San Diego. Ensign Shelton was assigned to Scouting Squadron 6 (VS-6) on 17 April 1942 and was reported missing on 4 June 1942 during the Battle of Midway. For his heroism and devotion to duty, Ensign Shelton was awarded the Navy Cross posthumously.

Namesake
Two ships have been named USS Shelton in his honor.

References

People from Fergus County, Montana
1916 births
1942 deaths
United States Navy officers
Recipients of the Navy Cross (United States)
United States Navy personnel killed in World War II
Missing in action of World War II